The foreign relations of the Dominican Republic are the Dominican Republic's relations with other governments.

The Dominican Republic has a close relationship with the United States and with the other states of the Inter-American system. It has accredited diplomatic missions in most Western Hemisphere countries and in principal European capitals.

History

The island nation of the Dominican Republic maintains very limited relations with most of the countries of Africa, Asia, the Middle East, and Eastern Europe. It concentrated its diplomatic activities in four critical arenas: the circum-Caribbean, Latin America, the United States, and Western Europe (mainly West Germany, Spain, and France).

Diplomatic relations

Bilateral relations

Africa

Americas

Asia

Europe

Multilateral relations
The Dominican Republic is a founding member of the United Nations and many of its specialized and related agencies, including the World Bank, International Labour Organization, International Atomic Energy Agency, and International Civil Aviation Organization. It also is a member of the OAS, World Trade Organization, World Health Organization, World Customs Organization the Inter-American Development Bank, Central American Integration System, and ACP Group.

See also
List of diplomatic missions in the Dominican Republic
List of diplomatic missions of the Dominican Republic

References

External links
 Dominican Ministry of Foreign Affairs